Clyde Borg (born 20 March 1992) is a Maltese international footballer who plays for Floriana as a midfielder.

References

1992 births
Living people
Maltese footballers
Malta international footballers
Floriana F.C. players
Maltese Premier League players
Association football midfielders